The men's 100 metre freestyle was one of six swimming events on the swimming at the 1908 Summer Olympics programme. It was the shortest of the three individual freestyle events, as the 50 yard freestyle had been dropped after its one appearance on the 1904 Summer Olympics programme. The 100 metre event was contested for the third time after it had been held at the 1896 and 1906 Olympics. The 1904 Olympics saw a 100-yard event. The competition was held on Friday 17 July 1908 and Monday 20 July 1908. Thirty-four swimmers from twelve nations competed. Each nation was limited to 12 swimmers.

The event was won by Charles Daniels of the United States, the first time Hungary had been beaten in the event (excluding Intercalated Games). Zoltán Halmay of Hungary, the winner in 1900, finished second. Harald Julin's bronze was Sweden's first medal in the event.

These were the first Olympic Games in which a 100-metre pool had been especially constructed (inside the main stadium's track and field oval). Previous Olympic events were swum in open water (1896: The Mediterranean Sea, 1900: The Seine River, 1904: an artificial lake).

Background

This was the third appearance of the men's 100 metre freestyle (including the 100 yard event in 1904 but excluding the Intercalated Games in 1906). The event has been held at every Summer Olympics except 1900 (when the shortest freestyle was the 200 metres), though the 1904 version was measured in yards rather than metres.

Two of the six finalists from 1904 returned: gold medalist Zoltán Halmay of Hungary and silver medalist Charles Daniels of the United States. Daniels had beaten Halmay at the 1906 Intercalated Games. Halmay held the world record.

Australasia, Belgium, Canada, Denmark, France, Great Britain, Italy, the Netherlands, and Sweden each made their debut in the event. Hungary and the United States each made their third appearance, having competed at each edition of the event to date.

Competition format

With a much larger field than in 1904, the 1908 competition expanded to three rounds: heats, semifinals, and a final. The 1908 Games also restored the wild-card system from 1900, allowing the fastest swimmers who did not win their heat to advance. The nine heats consisted of between 1 and 6 swimmers, with the winner of the heat advancing along with the fastest loser from across the heats (all tied swimmers advanced in the case of equal times). There were two semifinals, intended to be of 5 swimmers each but one of which actually had 6 due to a tie in the heats; the top 2 finishers in each semifinal (regardless of overall time) advanced to the 4-person final.

Each race involved a single length of the 100 metre pool, with no turns. Any stroke could be used.

Records

These were the standing world and Olympic records (in minutes) prior to the 1908 Summer Olympics.

(*) Intercalated Games

(**) 100 yards (91.44 m)

In the first heat Zoltán Halmay set a new Olympic record with 1:08.2. In the fifth heat Charles Daniels and in the seventh heat Wilfred Edwards equalized the standing world record of 1:05.8. Finally Charles Daniels set a new world record with 1:05.6 in the final.

Schedule

Results

Heats

The fastest swimmer in each heat and the fastest loser advanced. Because there was a tie for fastest loser, both men advanced. Thus, 11 swimmers qualified for the semifinals.

Heat 1

Heat 2

Heat 3

Heat 4

Heat 5

Heat 6

Heat 7

Heat 8

Dockrell had no competition in the eighth heat.

Heat 9

Semifinals

The fastest two swimmers from each semifinal advanced to the final.

Semifinal 1

Semifinal 2

Final

Halmay started fast, leading for the first 30 metres until he was caught by Daniels. Daniels took a slight lead at the halfway mark and won by half a yard.

Results summary

References

Sources
 
 

Men's freestyle 0100 metres